The Tobamovirus internal ribosome entry site (IRES) is an element that allows cap and end-independent translation of mRNA in the host cell. The IRES achieves this by mediating the internal initiation of translation by recruiting a ribosomal 43S pre-initiation complex directly to the initiation codon and eliminates the requirement for the eukaryotic initiation factor, eIF4F.

See also 
Mnt IRES
N-myc IRES
TrkB IRES

References

External links 
 

Cis-regulatory RNA elements
Tobamovirus